Indeni is an Israeli software developing company which develops Network automation and cloud security software. They offer scripts to validate firewall, router, switch and load balancer configurations and performance to help reduce and/or avoid network downtime. The company is backed by Sequoia Capital. Indeni provides security infrastructure automation with unprecedented visibility that’s ready to go in minutes. Production-ready automation elements are curated from vetted, community-sourced experience, to replace tedious tasks with turn-key integration with your existing processes. It's certified automation, with control, so you can focus on mission-critical projects that drive new business.

Indeni's mission is to automate security tasks and processes for the benefit of organizations around the world. By automating time-consuming tasks, we increase the security posture of the organizations’ IT systems and allow engineering teams to deliver business-promoting projects more rapidly.

Leading enterprises trust Indeni to protect their network reliability and data security, including two of the world's largest credit card issuers, financial auditors, government agencies, hospital networks, and many others.

Indeni offers two main solutions to support both network engineers and cloud security engineers:

 Our crowd-sourced automation platform performs health and compliance checks for network security appliances (firewalls, proxies, load balancers), resolving issues before they result in downtime.
Our cloud security analysis tool, Cloudrail, scans infrastructure-as-code files for violations of security requirements before cloud environments are provisioned or modified. Cloudrail integrates directly into the CI/CD pipeline, highlighting security issues for developers to solve before the code is merged.

Overview
The company provides a way, using crowd-sourcing and an open development process, to collect data on device behavior in enormous amounts. Their technology supports many products including Cisco switches, Check Point firewalls, F5 BIG-IP, Fortinet, Fireeye, Gigamon, Juniper, Palo Alto Networks, Radware and other devices. The software that they provide identifies issues that are not caught with SNMP monitoring.

History
Indeni was founded in 2009 by Yonadav Leitersdorf. It was created by a team of networking, cyber security experts and software technicians. They are currently supported by venture capital funds, Sequoia Capital. 

Some customers of Indeni include: 
 MasterCard
 Boston Scientific
Bloomberg
 Comcast
 ING Bank
 Leumi-Card
 Office Depot
 Scottrade
Trinity Health
 Prudential Financial
 The University of Alabama
 Wyndham Worldwide

References

Software companies of Israel
Network management
Israeli brands